Fresh Dressed is a 2015 documentary film directed by Sacha Jenkins which chronicles the history of hip hop fashion. The film is Jenkins' directorial debut. North American rights to the film were purchased by Samuel Goldwyn Films and StyleHaul following its premiere at the 2015 Sundance Film Festival. The film features Kanye West, Pharrell Williams, Swizz Beats, and other prominent hip hop figures as talking heads. CNN plans to air the film later in 2015.

Production
The film took Jenkins around 18 months to make. Nas co-produced the film with Peter Bittenbender and Marcus A. Clarke.

References

External links
 
 

2015 documentary films
2015 films
American documentary films
Documentary films about African Americans
Documentary films about hip hop music and musicians
Films about fashion
Hip hop fashion
2010s English-language films
2010s American films